The ice hockey competition was one of the events held at the 2019 Winter Deaflympics.

The competition consisted of the men's tournament only. The original idea was to also organise a women's ice hockey tournament, but the International Committee of Sports for the Deaf cancelled the event due to the low number of countries registered on it.

Participating nations 

  Canada
  Finland
  Kazakhstan
  Russia
  United States

Preliminary round

All times are local (UTC+1).

Bronze medal game

Gold medal game

Medalists

References 

Deaflympics
2019 Winter Deaflympics events